Simone Raffini (born 28 December 1996) is an Italian football player. He plays for Athletic Carpi.

Club career
He made his Serie B debut for Cesena on 11 October 2015 in a game against Cagliari.

On 11 September 2020 he signed a 2-year contract with Fermana. On 27 January 2021, he joined Paganese on loan. On 24 August 2021, his contract with Fermana was terminated by mutual consent. He subsequently joined Athletic Carpi in Serie D.

References

External links
 

1996 births
People from Castel San Pietro Terme
Footballers from Emilia-Romagna
Living people
Italian footballers
Association football forwards
A.C. Cesena players
Pordenone Calcio players
S.S.D. Lucchese 1905 players
U.S. Città di Pontedera players
Ravenna F.C. players
Fermana F.C. players
Paganese Calcio 1926 players
Serie B players
Serie C players
Serie D players
Sportspeople from the Metropolitan City of Bologna